Pachyhyrax was a genus of herbivorous hyrax-grouped mammal belonging to the clade Paenungulata.

References

Prehistoric placental genera
Fossil taxa described in 1910
Prehistoric hyraxes